Edmund Tudor, 1st Earl of Richmond ( – 3 November 1456, also known as Edmund of Hadham), was the father of King Henry VII of England and a member of the Tudor family of Penmynydd, North Wales. Born to Owen Tudor and the dowager queen Catherine of Valois, Edmund was half-brother to Henry VI of England. Edmund was raised for several years by Katherine de la Pole and Henry took an interest in Edmund's upbringing, granting him a title and lands once he came of age. Both Edmund and his brother, Jasper, were made advisers to the King, as they were his closest remaining blood relatives.

The brothers were made senior earls in the royal court and had influential positions in the Parliament of England. Edmund was also granted Baynard's Castle, London, and ran a successful estate. He was married to Margaret Beaufort, Countess of Richmond and Derby, after her first marriage was annulled. Prior to the start of the Wars of the Roses, Edmund liaised with Richard of York and supported him when the King fell ill during 1453–1454. After war began in 1455, York sent Edmund to uphold the authority of the King in South Wales. While he was there, York was overthrown by the King and, in retaliation, Yorkist forces were sent to engage those of Tudor's in South Wales. Edmund was captured at Carmarthen Castle, where he died of the bubonic plague on 3 November 1456.

Birth and early life
Following the death of Henry V of England, the Queen dowager Catherine of Valois married Owen Tudor. The marriage was in secret, and was not common knowledge until after Catherine's death. It is accepted that Catherine and Owen were married around 1429/30, as the Queen stopped living in the household of her son Henry VI, and Owen was granted the rights of an Englishman in the Parliament of May 1432.

The children of Catherine and Owen were born away from court. Their first son, Edmund, was born at Much Hadham Palace, Hertfordshire. The manor house was owned by the Bishop of London. In 1436, his mother retired to Bermondsey Abbey, where she died on 3 January 1437. With Catherine dead, the Queen's enemies moved against Owen. He was called to London, but was acquitted by the Royal court of charges relating to the marriage. While en route to Wales, he was arrested and imprisoned in Newgate Prison. After he escaped in early 1438, he was recaptured and imprisoned once more in Windsor Castle.

Following the death of their mother and the imprisonment of their father, Edmund and his brother Jasper were brought up in the care of Katherine de la Pole, the daughter of Michael de la Pole, 2nd Earl of Suffolk, with whom they remained till at least March 1442. Henry VI began to take notice of his half-brothers by that point. He ensured that they were placed in the care of priests who oversaw their teaching. Edmund, and his brother and father, were taken into Henry's royal household. Henry was seemingly fond of his half brothers, and ennobled each of them with Edmund becoming Earl of Richmond on 15 December 1449, and Jasper Earl of Pembroke on 23 November 1452.

Earl of Richmond

As Earls, and recognised by court as the King's half brothers, Edmund and Jasper had unparalleled precedence over all other non-clerics in the court, with the exception of the Dukes. They were each given lands, although Jasper received a yearly stipend until Pembroke became available. After seven years of marriage to Margaret of Anjou, Henry was still childless. After the death of Humphrey, Duke of Gloucester, the royal line was at risk, and the Tudor brothers were considered as possible heirs. There were concerns that while they were of French royal descent through Catherine, they had no blood relation to the English throne.

By 1452, Edmund and Jasper were both among Henry's small group of personal advisers; they were the only blood relations in court. However, neither was skilled at matters of state within England, and instead they were primarily given the task of ensuring the authority of the King within Wales. This resulted in a long-held affection for the family in that country. The formal investiture of the duo took place in the Tower of London on 5 January 1453. Later that year on 6 March, they took their seats in the Parliament of England as the head of all the Earls in the court. After a petition by the House of Commons of England, both Jasper and Edmund were recognised officially as legitimate half-brothers of the King and the statutory disabilities associated with being considered Welsh were removed. In 1452 and 1453, Henry gave them large monetary grants, and also gave Edmund property in Westmorland and Lancashire. Edmund ran a profitable estate and invested in the wool industry based in Boston, Lincolnshire. Henry also granted him the medieval palace of Baynard's Castle, near to the River Thames in London.

Wars of the Roses, marriage, and death
In the summer of 1453, Henry suffered a mental breakdown which lasted over 17 months. Several parties sought to take power during this period. Henry's wife, Margaret of Anjou, demanded to be declared Regent. The Tudor brothers supported Richard of York, who sought to become Protector of the Realm. However, Edmund did not attend the Parliament of 3 April 1454 where York was named Protector. Edmund did attend the council of advisors to the Protector, although not as frequently as Jasper. Both brothers were in attendance in November 1445, when the council reduced the size of the Royal Household. As a result, they each received an entourage of a chaplain, two esquires, two yeomen and two chamberlains.

The King recovered around Christmas of 1454, and dismissed York, with resultant hostility. This left the Tudor brothers in a quandary. Edmund was not at the First Battle of St Albans on 22 May 1455, where Henry was captured by Richard of York. Both brothers attended the following Parliament where York was once again named Protector. While York cancelled the majority of the grants Henry had made during his reign, those to Edmund and Jasper were exempt. Both brothers were absent when the second session of Parliament that year began on 12 November; Edmund had been sent to Wales to put down the rebellion of Gruffudd ap Nicolas.

Margaret Beaufort was the daughter and only child of John Beaufort, 1st Duke of Somerset. Through her father, she also was a great-granddaughter of John of Gaunt. As such she carried a claim to the throne. Thus she was married as a child to John de la Pole, son of the ambitious Duke of Suffolk. However, the Duke was murdered in 1450.

In early 1453, the marriage of Margaret and John was annulled, and on 24 March Edmund was given wardship of Margaret, still only nine years old. Edmund married Margaret on 1 November 1455 at Bletsoe Castle. It was through Margaret that Edmund's son could claim the English throne.

The marriage was consummated immediately. Edmund died a year later, leaving a 13-year-old widow who was seven months pregnant with their child, Henry Tudor.

Capture, captivity and death

Gruffudd made war with the troops under Edmund, capturing the castles at Aberystwyth, Carmarthen and Carreg Cennen by June 1456. The rebellion didn't last long, and by early August, Edmund's forces had retaken those castles although minor skirmishes continued for several months longer. While Edmund was in Wales, the King had deposed York. In retaliation, York sent 2,000 men under William Herbert on 10 August to take South Wales. When they arrived at Carmarthen Castle, they took the stronghold and captured Edmund Tudor.

As Herbert's troops moved on to Aberystwyth, Edmund was left behind, imprisoned in Carmarthen Castle. On 3 November 1456, Edmund became infected with the bubonic plague and died there. He was buried at the nearby Franciscan Church in Carmarthen. There were suspicions that Edmund may have been murdered, and so a trial was held several months later with several parties accused, but no one was found guilty. Edmund's remains were removed to the choir of St David's Cathedral, Pembrokeshire, in 1539, due to the dissolution of the monasteries enacted by his grandson, King Henry VIII of England of the Royal House of Tudor.

Ancestry

Notes

References

|-
 
 

Edmund
15th-century English people
Earls of Richmond (1452 creation)
15th-century deaths from plague (disease)
1456 deaths
Infectious disease deaths in Wales
Burials at St Davids Cathedral
1430 births
People from Much Hadham
Edmund
People of the Wars of the Roses